Sirac may refer to one of the following:

 Mount Sirac, a peak in the Massif des Écrins, France
 Sirac, Gers, a commune of the Gers department in France
 Sirač, a municipality in Croatia
 An alternative name for the Syrah grape